The , or Nagoya-Kōbe Expressway  is a toll expressway in Japan. It runs from a junction with the Tōmei Expressway in Komaki, Aichi (outside Nagoya) west to Nishinomiya, Hyōgo (between Osaka and Kobe). It is the main road link between Osaka and Nagoya, and, along with the Tōmei Expressway, forms the main road link between Osaka and Tokyo. East of the Chūgoku Expressway near Osaka, it is part of Asian Highway Network.

The part east of interchange 29 (Yōkaichi) is owned by the Central Nippon Expressway Company; the rest is owned by the West Nippon Expressway Company.

History
The Meishin Expressway was the first expressway in Japan, with a section near Osaka and Kyoto opening July 16, 1963.

The Meishin Expressway parallels the old Nakasendō between Kyoto and Nagoya, now Route 8 and Route 21. The Meihan National Highway is a mostly non-tolled freeway between Osaka and Nagoya, lying further south and built to lower standards. The Shin-Meishin Expressway is an under-construction route between Osaka and Nagoya, lying between the two other high-speed roads, that will connect to the Shin-Tōmei Expressway (via the Isewangan Expressway) and the Sanyō Expressway. It roughly parallels the old Tōkaidō (Route 1).

During the Great Hanshin earthquake of January 17, 1995, the Meishin Expressway was lightly damaged but could only be used by emergency vehicles for weeks after the earthquake. It was the only remaining link between Osaka and Kobe for some time after the quake.

List of interchanges and features

Interchanges not yet opened, closed, or abandoned are shown with a gray background. Exit numbers continue from the sequence of the Tomei Expressway.

 IC - interchange, SIC - smart interchange, JCT - junction, PA - parking area, SA - service area, TN - tunnel, BS - Bus stop (S - open, X - closed)

References

See also

Central Nippon Expressway Company
West Nippon Expressway Company
 Transport in Greater Nagoya
 Transport in Keihanshin

Expressways in Japan
AH1
Roads in Aichi Prefecture
Roads in Gifu Prefecture
Roads in Hyōgo Prefecture
Roads in Kyoto Prefecture
Roads in Osaka Prefecture
Roads in Shiga Prefecture
1963 establishments in Japan